The 1985 Quebec general election was held on December 2, 1985, to elect members of the National Assembly of the Province of Quebec, Canada. The Quebec Liberal Party, led by former premier Robert Bourassa, defeated the incumbent Parti Québécois, led by Premier Pierre-Marc Johnson.

This election marked the comeback of Robert Bourassa, whose political career had been thought to be over after losing the 1976 general election and resigning as Liberal leader. However, Bourassa personally failed to win his own seat in the Bertrand electoral district, and had to run in a by-election one month later in the safe Saint-Laurent electoral district.  The 1985 Quebec general election result produced by far the largest majority of any Canadian legislative election (in terms of the number of seats) by a winning party whose leader failed to win his own seat.

Johnson, son of former Union Nationale premier Daniel Johnson Sr. was unable to revive the PQ's fortune after he succeeded René Lévesque as party leader and premier. Pierre-Marc's brother, Daniel Johnson Jr., later became leader of the Liberal Party and briefly served as premier.

This election was the last contested by the Union Nationale. It only ran candidates in 19 ridings, none of whom came close to being elected.  The party would be wound up by election authorities in 1989. It is also the last Quebec general election to date where the largest party won a majority government while also getting over 50% of the popular vote.

Results
The overall results were:

See also
 List of Quebec premiers
 Politics of Quebec
 Timeline of Quebec history
 33rd National Assembly of Quebec

References

Further reading

External links
 CBC TV video clip
 Results by party (total votes and seats won)
 Results for all ridings

Quebec general election
Elections in Quebec
General election
Quebec general election